Saffig is a municipality in the district of Mayen-Koblenz in Rhineland-Palatinate, western Germany.

The emblem
The organ pipes and the ear show St. Cäcilia, the patron saint of the Catholic church of Saffig. The lava dome shows the territory of volcanos, where Saffig is.

History
The village was first referenced in 1258 as "Saffge". Saffig was a fiefdom of Cologne until 1481, when it became a fiefdom of the family von der Leyen. After the annexation of sinistral territory of the Rhine during the French Revolutionary Wars (1794–1815), Saffig was a "Mairie" of France.
Saffig has been part of the Pellenz Verbandsgemeinde since 1992.

Buildings and sights
 St. Cäcilia Catholic Church - Designed by Balthasar Neumann (1739–1742) and his pupil Johannes Seiz
 The Palace Garden - Formerly part of the Palace territory of the family von der Leyen
 Synagogue - Now a memorial
 "Von-der-Leyen Halle" - A multipurpose hall

References

Municipalities in Rhineland-Palatinate
Mayen-Koblenz